Alpha Omicron Pi (AOII, Alpha O) is an international women's fraternity founded on January 2, 1897, at Barnard College on the campus of Columbia University in New York City.

"AOII," and "Alpha O," the familiar names of the fraternity, is open to women regardless of ethnicity, religion or socio-economic background, with 134 active collegiate chapters and 159 active alumnae chapters in Canada and the U.S.A. The fraternity is headquartered in Brentwood, Tennessee, and is a member of the National Panhellenic Conference. Major symbolism includes the color cardinal,  the ruby and the 'Général Jacqueminot' rose. The fraternity publishes a magazine for the benefit of members, named To Dragma.

Alpha Omicron Pi was founded on the ideas found in the object of the fraternity—character, dignity, scholarship, and college loyalty.

History
The fraternity was founded January 2, 1897, at Barnard College by four women: Jessie Wallace Hughan, Helen St. Clair Mullan, Elizabeth Heywood Wyman, and Stella George Stern Perry. They pledged one another in the Columbia Law Library to begin their fraternity. Within one week of its founding, the four founders used their initiation ritual for the first time to initiate Anne Richardson Hall.

National expansion began in 1898 with the founding of Pi Chapter at New Orleans' Sophie Newcomb College (now part of Tulane University).  Stella George Stern Perry, who was then the president of the fraternity, contacted a New Orleans classmate, Evelyn Reed, who expressed compatible ideas about fraternities. Reed's sister, Katherine Reed, became the first pledge of Pi Chapter. After being initiated by Perry, Katherine Reed found others to initiate.

In 1905, Alpha Omicron Pi joined the National Panhellenic Conference.

In 1967, the fraternity partnered with the Arthritis Foundation. In 1999, the fraternity's national council voted to establish AOII Properties, a branch which manages individual chapter housing, including safety, finances, and maintenance. The subsidiary was then officially formed in 2001 but did not begin to transfer local housing contracts to national corporation control until 2009.

Symbols 
Alpha Omicron Pi has one official color, cardinal. Its official flower is the 'Général Jacqueminot', or Jacqueminot rose. Alternatively, a deep red rose may be used. The fraternity's official jewel is the ruby, while its mascot is the giant panda, which the fraternity unofficially adopted in 1976 but made official in 2017.

Members of the fraternity wear three different pins depending on membership status. New members who have not been initiated wear a gold sheaf of wheat pin bound by a ribbon bearing the letters AOII, symbolizing individuals bound together by friendship. After initiation, members may wear the membership badge. When the fraternity establishes a new charter, the founding members wear gold rose charter member pins which symbolize new growth.

Philanthropy 

Alpha Omicron Pi participates in fundraising and volunteer efforts via its philanthropic arm, the Alpha Omicron Pi Foundation. The foundation allocates grants to the fraternity's philanthropy, arthritis research, as well scholarships, educational grants, and emergency funds for fraternity members. The funds also support conference speakers, training events, and personal development programs for members.

The fraternity is partnered with the Arthritis Foundation. The partnership began in 1967, with the fraternity members contributing volunteer hours and fundraising events to raise money for arthritis research and camps for juvenile arthritis. Stuffed panda bears are collected each year to give to children attending Arthritis Foundation camps and conferences. The fraternity's national campaign for arthritis awareness is “AOII Goes Blue,” with local chapters creating individual chapter events.  "Strike Out Arthritis!" (SOA) Is the fraternity's signature fundraising event. SOA Events are held each year at MLB games since the fraternity cites "strong relationships [with] Major League Baseball teams." Individual chapters hold their own SOA events which vary from bowling tournaments to pageants to barbecues with funds going to AOII Foundation specifically for arthritis research.

Other programs the fraternity supports is Sisters for Soldiers, where members collect items and write letters to soldiers.

Programs 
The Ruby Fund are grants that are raised by alumnae and collegiate members awarded to past initiated sisters in need of financial help from sisters. Applications for assistance are reviewed and ultimately chosen by the Foundation's Ruby Fund Committee.

Membership

Chapters

Since 1897, the fraternity has initiated over 209,000 members in 205 collegiate chapters across the United States and Canada, with 136 active chapters.

Alumnae 
Entertainment

Literature and Music

Media

Politics and advocacy

Sports

See also
List of social fraternities and sororities

References

 
1897 establishments in New York City
Student organizations established in 1897
National Panhellenic Conference
Student societies in the United States